Elisabeth Aasen (9 February 1922 – 12 November 2009) was a Norwegian politician for the Socialist Electoral League.

She served as a deputy representative to the Parliament of Norway from Møre og Romsdal during the term 1973–1977. In total she met during 13 days of parliamentary session.

References

1922 births
2009 deaths
Deputy members of the Storting
Socialist Left Party (Norway) politicians
Møre og Romsdal politicians
Women members of the Storting
20th-century Norwegian women politicians
20th-century Norwegian politicians